Harpalus stevensi is a species of ground beetle in the subfamily Harpalinae. It was described by Kataev in 2011. Two new species of the genus Harpalus Latreille, 1802 were described: H. stevensi from China (Sichuan) and H. dudkoi from Turkey (Adana). Both species belong to the nominotypical subgenus and are included in the tardus species-group.

See also 
 List of Harpalus species

References

stevensi
Beetles described in 2011